Cotton Mary is a 1999 film co-directed by Ismail Merchant, best known as the producer half of Merchant Ivory, and the Indian actress and writer Madhur Jaffrey, who also co-starred. It is a sensual film, shot in coastal South India.

Plot
Lily Macintosh (Scacchi), an upper-class British woman living in India, has struggled since the birth of her child and is in need of a nanny. An Indian military nurse known as Cotton Mary (Jaffrey) takes the post; she is an ambitious woman who is eager to be part of British society. She seems kind at first, but her true nature gradually reveals itself as she manipulates everyone around her to get what she wants.

Cast
 Greta Scacchi as Lily MacIntosh
 Madhur Jaffrey as Cotton Mary
 James Wilby as John MacIntosh
 Sarah Badel as Mrs Evans
 Riju Bajaj as Mugs
 Gerson da Cunha as Doctor Correa
 Joanna David as Mrs Smythe
 Neena Gupta as Blossom (Mary's sister)
 Sakina Jaffrey as Rosie
 Gemma Jones as Mrs Freda Davids
 Firdausi Jussawalla as Mr. Panamal
 Mahabanoo Mody-Kotwal as Matron
 Nadira as Mattie
 Prayag Raaj as Abraham
 Captain Raju as Inspector Ramiji Raj
 Shobha Vijay as Ayah 2
 Virendra Saxena as Joseph
 Surekha Sikri as Gwen
 Laura Lumley as Theresa MacIntosh
 Matteo Piero Mantegazza as Baba
 Olivia Caesar as Baba
 Arshia Rafique as Mira
 Philip Tabor as Henry Campbell-Jones
 Luke Jones as Charlie
 Susan Malick - Bunny Rogers
 Hamza - Fisherman
 Poornima Mohan as Receptionist
 Txuku Iriarte Solana as Sylvie D'Costa

Reception
On Metacritic the film has a score of 52% based on reviews from 18 critics. On Rotten Tomatoes the film has an approval rating of 36% based on reviews from 33 critics.

Roger Ebert gave the film two out of four stars.

References

External links
 Cotton Mary
 

1999 films
1999 drama films
British drama films
English-language French films
Films directed by Madhur Jaffrey
Films directed by Ismail Merchant
Films set in India
French drama films
Merchant Ivory Productions films
1990s English-language films
1990s British films
1990s French films